The Garawan languages (Garrwan), or Yanyi, are a small  language family of Australian Aboriginal languages currently spoken in northern Australia.

The languages are:
Garawa (Garrwa, north)
Waanyi † (Wanji, south)
Gunindiri † (Kurnindirri, southwest)
Gunindiri is almost entirely unknown.

Garawan may be related to the Pama–Nyungan languages, though this is not accepted in Bowern 2011. The languages are close: Dixon (2002) says that it should be straightforward to reconstruct proto-Garawa–Wanji.

Vocabulary
Capell (1940) lists the following basic vocabulary items:

{| class="wikitable sortable" class="wikitable sortable"
! gloss
! Garama !! Waneiga
|-
! man
|  || 
|-
! woman
|  || 
|-
! head
|  || 
|-
! eye
|  || 
|-
! nose
|  || 
|-
! mouth
|  || 
|-
! tongue
|  || 
|-
! stomach
|  || 
|-
! bone
|  || 
|-
! blood
|  || 
|-
! kangaroo
|  || 
|-
! opossum
|  || 
|-
! crow
|  || 
|-
! fly
|  || 
|-
! sun
|  || 
|-
! moon
|  || 
|-
! fire
|  || 
|-
! smoke
|  || 
|-
! water
|  || 
|}

References

 
Language families

Non-Pama-Nyungan languages